Pieter Laurens Mol is a Dutch contemporary artist who combines photography, film, painting, drawing, sculpture and installation in his works. He was born in Breda, Netherlands in 1946, and studied photography at St. Joost Art Academy. He has been represented in numerous collections around the world, including the Museum of Modern Art, the Farideh Cadot Gallery, the Museum of Contemporary Art Antwerp and LA Louver Gallery.

References 

Date of birth missing (living people)
Living people
Dutch contemporary artists
1946 births
People from Breda